Sir Hadji Mohamed Macan Markar (7 September 1877 – 10 May 1952) was a prominent Ceylonese colonial era legislator and businessmen. He was Minister of Home Affairs of the State Council, member of the Legislative Council and a Senator.

Markar was born 5 October 1885 in Galle, the son of Oduma Lebbe Marikar Macan Markar, a wealthy merchant from Galle, and was educated at Wesley College, Colombo, where he played cricket before going into the family business.

Markar was elected as a member of the Legislative Council of Ceylon in 1924 and later to the State Council. He became the Minister of Communications and Works. He was knighted in the 1938 Birthday Honours as a Knight Bachelor.  From 1948 to 1952 he was a member of the Senate of Ceylon. He was knighted in 1938.

Markar's sons were Ahmed Hussain Macan Markar, former member of parliament for Batticaloa; Muhammad Ajward Macan Markar, FRCP, Professor of Medicine, University of Ceylon, Peradeniya and Alavi Ibrahim Macan Markar, FCA.

See also
List of political families in Sri Lanka

External links and references

Dr. T. B. Jayah loved humanity 
Mohamed Ajwad Macan Markar

1877 births
1952 deaths
Alumni of Wesley College, Colombo
Ceylonese Knights Bachelor
Members of the 1st State Council of Ceylon
Members of the Senate of Ceylon
People from British Ceylon
Sri Lankan Moor politicians
Communications ministers of Sri Lanka
Members of the Legislative Council of Ceylon